The Church of St George, Chester Road, Hulme, Manchester, is an early Gothic Revival church by Francis Goodwin, built in 1826–8.  It was restored in 1884 by J. S. Crowther.  It was designated a Grade II* listed building on 3 October 1974.

The church was a Commissioners' church, (built to celebrate the victory at the Battle of Waterloo) who allotted the sum of £15,000 for construction. Goodwin was an obvious choice for architect having already undertaken a number of churches in the Midlands and the North West, as well as the original Manchester Town Hall.  Sir Nikolaus Pevsner considers that Goodwin's inspiration was Nicholas Hawksmoor's St Michael, Cornhill and that "the whole makes a lively and memorable picture". A six-bay nave with "high three-light Perpendicular windows" concludes with a tall tower at the west end, and two high pinnacles at the east. Porches are set at the northwest and southwest corners.

Drawing from Pevsner, the English Heritage inspectors who listed the building in 1974, without an internal inspection, stated that the interior was "reported as having: galleries; Perpendicular arcades; [and a] wall monument to The Hon. George Berkeley Molyneux (d.1841), by Edward Physick, in form of soldier mourning beside urn."

A declining inner-city population in the post-war period, combined with the increasing isolation of the church caused by major road construction in its vicinity, led to St George's closure in 1984. The last Rector Revd Derek Seber worked with Brian Redhead to try to find a long term use for the building including as a museum for Rolls-Royce and as a Museum of Sport . The transformation into such was planned under the then governments Community Programme offering skill training in conservation and building skills. A change in policy brought this initiative to an end. There followed a "twenty-year search for a use which would preserve the interior … proved fruitless and the building was converted to flats (in) 2000–2.  The interior can no longer be read as a whole." In 2015, the flat occupying the church tower was on the market for £1 million.

See also

Grade II* listed buildings in Greater Manchester
Listed buildings in Manchester-M15
List of churches in Greater Manchester
List of works by Francis Goodwin
List of works by J. S. Crowther
List of churches dedicated to St. George

References

Grade II* listed churches in Manchester
Church of England church buildings in Greater Manchester
Former churches in Greater Manchester
Churches in Manchester
Gothic Revival church buildings in Greater Manchester
Commissioners' church buildings